Common Sense Media (CSM) is an organization that reviews and provides ratings for media and technology with the goal of providing information on their suitability for children. It also funds research on the role of media in the lives of children and advocates publicly for child-friendly policies and laws regarding media.

Founded by Jim Steyer in 2003, Common Sense Media reviews (And allows users to do the same, divided into adult and child sections) books, movies, streaming/TV shows, video games, apps, music (until 2014), websites, & podcasts and rates them in terms of age-appropriate educational content, such as "positive role models", "positive messages", diverse representation, "violence and scariness", "sexual content", "language", "consumerism" and more, for families and caregivers making media choices for their children. They have also developed a set of ratings to evaluate apps, games, and websites used in a learning environment.

Donations from foundations and individuals and fees from media partners finance Common Sense Media. Today, the organization distributes its content to more than 100 million US homes via partnerships with a variety of media and tech companies. Common Sense Media describes itself as "the nation’s largest membership organization dedicated to improving kids’ media lives". By 2016, the organization had over 65 million unique users and worked with more than 275,000 educators across the United States. Common Sense serves over 100 million users a year. In 2016, Charlie Rose reported that Common Sense Media was the United States' largest non-profit dedicated to children's issues.

In August 2020, CSM announced the formation of a for-profit subsidiary, Common Sense Networks, to create and distribute original media targeted at children. Common Sense Networks then announced an OTT platform named Sensical, which launched June 29, 2021.

Early history
After founding JP Kids, an educational media company for children, and Children Now, a national child advocacy and media group, Jim Steyer founded Common Sense Media in 2003. In an interview with The New York Times , Steyer said he intended to “create a huge constituency for parents and children in the same way that Mothers Against Drunk Driving or the AARP has done." The group received $500,000 in seed money from a group of donors including Charles Schwab, George Roberts, and James Coulter.

To assess parents’ concern about their children's media habits, Common Sense Media commissioned a poll, which found that “64 percent [of parents with children aged 2–17] believed that media products in general were inappropriate for their families. It said that 81 percent expressed concern that the media in general were encouraging violent or antisocial behavior in children.” The polling firm, Penn, Schoen & Berland Associates, said that “only one out of five interviewed ‘fully trusted' the separate industry-controlled ratings systems for music, movies, video games and television.”

Entertainment reviews
Common Sense Media reviews thousands of movies, TV shows, music, video games, apps, web sites and books. Based on developmental criteria, the reviews provide guidance regarding each title's age appropriateness, as well as a “content grid” that rates particular aspects of the title including educational value, violence, sex, gender messages and role models, and more. For each title, they indicate the age for which a title is either appropriate or most relevant. An overall five-star quality rating is also included, as are discussion questions to help families talk about their entertainment. In addition to CSM's traditional rating system, they also offer a set of learning based ratings, which are designed to determine complex educational values.

CSM partners with a number of media companies that distribute the organization's free content to more than 100 million homes in the United States. According to their website, the organization has content distribution contracts with Road Runner, TiVo, Yahoo!, Comcast, Time Warner Cable, DIRECTV, Disney, NBC Universal, Netflix, Best Buy, Google, AOL/Huffington Post, Fandango, Trend Micro, Verizon Foundation, Nickelodeon, Bing, Cox Communications, Kaleidescape, AT&T, and NCM.
The organization's current rating system differs from the system used by the Motion Picture Association of America and the Entertainment Software Rating Board. It has received positive support from some parents, and was singled out by US President Barack Obama as a model for using technology to empower parents. Common Sense Media began allowing studios to use their ratings and endorsements in order to promote family-friendly movies in 2014. The first film to use the endorsement was Disney's Alexander and the Terrible, Horrible, No Good, Very Bad Day.

The website utilizes a metered paywall for thousands of its media reviews. Reading more than three media reviews per month requires a paid Common Sense Media subscription.

Education
As of 2016, the Common Sense Education program had grown to include over 300,000 member teachers in approximately 100,000 schools.

In 2009, CSM partnered with Harvard University and the organization Global Kids to organize a three-way communication with parents, teenagers, and educators about issues faced in the online world.

The organization has education programs for schools and other organizations to use with students and parents.

The first product is a Parent Media and Technology Education Program that was launched in late 2008. The program includes a comprehensive library of resources, like tip sheets, workshop slides and script, videos, and discussion guides that educators can use to engage and educate parents about technology issues ranging from media violence and commercialism to cyberbullying and cellphone etiquette.

The second product, launched in 2009, is a K-12 Digital Literacy and Citizenship Curriculum consisting of more than 60 lesson plans, student handouts, videos and interactive components that span three topic areas: Safety and Security, Digital Citizenship, and Research and Information Literacy.  The curriculum was informed by research done by Howard Gardner's GoodPlay Project at the Harvard Graduate School of Education.

The resources were developed with support from many foundations, including the Sherwood, MacArthur, and Hewlett Foundations, which enables CSM to offer these products to educators for free.

In 2012, CSM released its "Digital Passport," an online curriculum designed to teach children how to safely and responsibly navigate the Internet. The courses can be accessed for free by classroom teachers, who are then able to monitor their students' progress. Digital passport lessons are presented as games that reward progress with badges.

In 2021, resources were updated for UK learners, fully translated to British English and Welsh, and available in every school. Lessons are built on the same curriculum with the addition of new teaching tools and activities.

Graphite
In 2013 CSM launched Graphite, an online resource for teachers that allows them to review and rate educational technology. The project is supported by Chicago philanthropist Susan Crown and Microsoft co-founder Bill Gates' bgC3.

Advocacy issues
Common Sense Media has played a role in influencing billions of dollars in government spending on education-related technologies including classroom broadband access and various learning apps. In April 2015, they launched the national advocacy effort, Common Sense Kids Action, to push for certain state and federal efforts to bolster education for children.

Online privacy
CSM supported the U.S. Department of Commerce's creation of an "online privacy policy", which would include a "Privacy Bill of Rights" and would make clear which types of personal information companies are allowed to keep on clients. It has also called for updates  to the Children's Online Privacy Protection Act (COPPA) rules to ensure that they keep pace with changes in technology since the law was passed in 1998 – as documented by the organization in a report to the Federal Trade Commission as part of a review of the law.

The organization also helped Massachusetts Representative Edward Markey and Texas Representative Joe Barton draft legislation that required websites aimed at children under 13 to obtain parental permission before collecting personal information. According to The Wall Street Journal, the group also wanted websites to feature an "eraser button" that would allow children and teens to delete information that they've posted online about themselves. The group also favored a ban on "behavioral marketing" to children—ads targeted at children based on their online activities.

In 2013, CSM pushed for the passing of California's "Eraser Bill". In 2014, they advocated the passing of California Senate Bill 1177, which prohibits the sale and disclosure of schools' online student data. The bill also forbids targeted ads based on school information and the creation of student profiles when not used for education purposes. As of January 2015, social media websites must allow California children under age 18 to remove their own postings.

In 2018, CSM advocated for the California Consumer Privacy Act (CCPA). CSM also endorsed the California Privacy Rights Act (CPRA), a ballot measure to protect the privacy rights of California consumers and increase penalties on corporations that fail to protect children’s privacy.

Platform accountability

CSM supported Stop Hate for Profit, a boycott where advertisers were asked to pull their ads from Facebook in response to the platform’s spread of misinformation and hate speech. In July 2020, over 500 companies joined the boycott, including Adidas, Coca-Cola, and Unilever.

Founder Jim Steyer launched the Future of Tech Commission with former Massachusetts Governor Deval Patrick and former Education Secretary Margaret Spellings. The Commission will develop a tech policy agenda for the Biden administration.

Violent video games
Common Sense Media played a major role in the passage of the 2005 California law criminalizing the sale of violent video games to minors. The organization submitted an amicus brief to the Supreme Court regarding the case Brown v. Entertainment Merchants Association (formerly Schwarzenegger v. Entertainment Merchants Association). They published a survey, conducted by Zogby International, which asked 2100 parents whether or not they supported the "video game ban bill" – CA Law AB 1793; results showed that 72% of the respondents expressed support for the bill, and another 75% held negative views of the video game industry when it comes to how they protect children from violent video games.

On August 12, 2006, CSM protested to the Federal Trade Commission about the ESRB's rating downgrade of a revised version of Manhunt 2 from "Adults Only" to "Mature". It protested on the basis that the revised version of the game, which was censored to prevent the game from remaining banned in both countries, was still banned in the UK via the ratings given by the British Board of Film Classification (BBFC). They also noted that players could still play a "leaked uncensored version" of Manhunt 2 on modded PlayStation 2, as Take-Two Interactive mentioned. The organization asked the FTC to launch a federal investigation into the ESRB rating process, citing the wide availability of the leaked version and the damage to children that the censored version still had.

Questioning whether Common Sense Media had begun functioning as a lobbying group rather than advocacy group the Los Angeles Times called the organization "one of the most zealous voices when it comes to encouraging state legislation limiting the sale of ultra-violent games to minors" and was "splitting hairs" regarding the difference between lobbying and advocacy in its efforts.

Media and child health
Common Sense Media participated in the FCC's Child Obesity Taskforce in April 2006 and hosted Beyond Primetime, a panel discussion and conference on issues related to children and media, featuring lead executives from the nation's top media.

In June 2006, CSM and The Department of Clinical Bioethics at the National Institutes of Health released a white paper, which outlines the ways that media exposure can impact children's health. The paper evaluated 173 media-related studies from the past 28 years and concluded that "In 80% of the studies, greater media exposure is associated with negative health outcomes for children and adolescents."

In October 2006, the organization released a white paper compiled from existing research on body image perceptions in children and teens. The paper states more than half of boys as young as 6 to 8 think their ideal weight is thinner than their current size and that children with parents who are dissatisfied with their bodies are more likely to feel that way about their own.

In September 2017, CSM released a study which it developed in collaboration with the University of Southern California’s Annenberg School for Communication and Journalism focused on families in both Japan and America and technology use. Surveys of families in the United States were compared to surveys of Japanese families and found that both countries struggle with the impact of technology on family life and relationships.

Common Sense Media released a PSA with Goodby, Silverstein & Partners in 2017 called Device Free Dinner which featured Will Ferrell as a distracted dad at the dinner table, in order to raise awareness for responsible technology and media usage.

Common Sense is an endorser of the SUCCESS Act & Common Sense Media has partnered with ad agency Goodby Silverstein & Partners to encourage low income families to claim money due to them through the newly improved Child Tax Credit -- as much as $3,600 per child in an eligible family for one year.

Research
Common Sense Media's Program for the Study of Media and Children provides data relating to the developmental influence of technology on children.

References

2003 establishments in California
Media content ratings systems
Non-profit organizations based in San Francisco
Organizations established in 2003
Political advocacy groups in the United States
Recommender systems
Video game censorship
Mass media companies